The Natural Area Reserves System (NARS) of Hawaii is a statewide attempt to preserve in perpetuity specific land and water areas which support communities, as relatively unmodified as possible, of the natural flora and fauna, as well as geological sites, of Hawaii.

History
The diverse areas found in the NARS range from marine and coastal environments to lava flows, tropical rainforests, and even an alpine desert. Within these areas one can find rare endemic plants and animals, many of which are on the edge of extinction.

The Natural Area Reserves System is administered by the Department of Land and Natural Resources, Division of Forestry and Wildlife. Currently, management teams are working to control the encroachment of non-native plants and animals which threaten the existence of the natural biota on the reserves.

The reserves include:

Hawaii Island
 Kahaualea on Kilauea
 Kipahoehoe on Mauna Loa
  on Mauna Kea
 Manuka
 Mauna Kea Ice Age on upper slope of Mauna Kea
 Puu Makaala 
 Puu O Umi above Waimanu Valley
 Waiakea 1942 Lava Flow above Hilo, Hawaii

Kauai
 Hono O Na Pali
 Kuia

Maui
 West Maui
 Hanawi
 Kanaio
 Nakula
 Āhihi-Kina‘u

Molokai
 Olokui
 Puu Alii

Oahu
 Kaena Point
 Pahole
 Kaʻala

Notes

References
Hawaii State Government, Hawaii Revised Statutes Chapter 195
The Natural Area Reserves System's web site

Natural history of Hawaii
Protected areas of Hawaii
Nature reserves in Hawaii
1970 in law
1970 establishments in Hawaii
Environmental law in the United States
Protected areas established in 1970